Dehydrogenase/reductase SDR family member 4 is an enzyme that in humans is encoded by the DHRS4 gene.

References

Further reading